The Latvia men's national 3x3 team is a national basketball team of Latvia, governed by the Latvian Basketball Association.
It represents the country in international 3x3 (3 against 3) basketball competitions. The team won the first ever Olympic men's tournament in the 2020 Summer Olympics in Tokyo, beating the Russian Olympic Committee team in the gold medal final. 

Other honors include the gold at the 2017 European Championships in Amsterdam, silver at the 2019 World Championship and the 2018 European Championship, as well as bronze medals at the 2021 Olympic Qualifying Tournament.

The first game of streetball in Latvia took place on 29 May 1993 upon the start of the Adidas Streetball tournament in Riga. The first Latvian championship was organized by the LBA in 2012 and the same year – the first national team.

Competitions

Olympic Games

World Cup

Europe Cup

Roster
The roster for the 2020 Summer Olympics:

See also
Latvia men's national basketball team

References

External links
 

3
Men's national 3x3 basketball teams